The Taylor County School District is a public school district in Taylor County, Georgia, United States, based in Butler. It serves the communities of Butler and Reynolds.

Schools
The Taylor County School District has two elementary schools, one middle school, and one high school.

Elementary schools
Taylor County Primary School
Taylor County Upper Elementary

Middle school
Taylor County Middle School

High school
Taylor County High School

References

External links

School districts in Georgia (U.S. state)
Education in Taylor County, Georgia